This is a list of cover versions by notable music artists of songs written by songwriter and convicted murderer Charles Manson. The songs that Manson wrote were released on albums recorded by his followers.

References

Manson, Charles